John Krushenick (March 18, 1927 – June 19, 1998) painter and co-founder of the Brata Gallery in New York City.  He studied with Hans Hofmann, exhibited at the Leo Castelli Gallery in New York City, and MoMA Tokyo.  He and brother Nicholas Krushenick opened an artists' cooperative called the Brata Gallery in the late 1950s. During the late 1950s many cooperative galleries along Ninth and Tenth Street in New York City's East Village showcased the work of  young artists. The painters and sculptors showcased there were among the avant-garde of the day. According to some sources, one of the earliest of the postwar New York "shaped canvas" paintings, by Edward Clark, was shown at the Brata in 1957.

See also
New York School
Nicholas Krushenick
Tenth street galleries
Grandfather of Jackson Krushenick
Married to Frances Krushenick 1957
Children: Andra (1960), Joshua (1964), Jevon(1968)

External links
Information about Tenth Street Galleries
Transcripts/10th Street Galleries

1927 births
1998 deaths
20th-century American painters
American male painters
People from the Bronx
Painters from New York City
20th-century American male artists